Norwood High School is a high school in Norwood, Ohio which has been rated Excellent by the Ohio Department of Education.  It is the only high school in the Norwood City School District. The Drake Planetarium, located in the high school, is named after astronomer and astrophysicist Frank Drake and is linked to NASA. Norwood High School owns the 1936 state title for baseball. The interior of old Norwood High School, now Norwood Junior High School, was used to film several scenes appearing in the 1989 film An Innocent Man, starring Tom Selleck.

Ohio High School Athletic Association State Championships

Baseball - 1936 
Cross country - Chad Kincaid (1995, individual)
Track and field - Mike Marksbury (1973, shot put), Chad Kincaid (1996, 3200 meters)

Other awards
American football - Marc Edwards (1992 Ohio Mr. Football)

Notable alumni
Carl Bouldin, baseball player
Marc Edwards, American football player
Vera-Ellen, actress
Diane Pfister, artist
Brian Pillman, professional wrestler
Joseph Ralston, Vice Chairman of the Joint Chiefs of Staff and Supreme Allied Commander of NATO
Robert Bales, former Army soldier who murdered 16 Afghan Civilians, in what is known as the Kandahar massacre.

References

External links
District Website

High schools in Hamilton County, Ohio
Norwood, Ohio
Public high schools in Ohio